"The Platonic Permutation" is the ninth episode of the ninth season of The Big Bang Theory. The 192nd episode overall, it first aired on CBS on November 19, 2015. The story follows the characters throughout Thanksgiving. The first storyline explores Sheldon and Amy's relationship as they meet-up, after being broken up. The next subplot follows Bernadette, Raj, Emily and Howard where they volunteer at a soup kitchen and the last follows Leonard and Penny after they have a minor conflict as Penny forgets Leonard's birthday.

"The Platonic Permutation" features a guest appearance of South-African American entrepreneur and business magnate, Elon Musk as himself. Critics had mixed reviews of the episode. Critics praised Sheldon and Amy's storyline, but were critical of the other two subplots and of Musk's appearance.

Plot
With Sheldon Cooper (Jim Parsons) and Amy Farrah Fowler (Mayim Bialik) still broken up and all of his friends busy for Thanksgiving, Sheldon tries to give Amy tickets he bought them to Thanksgiving dinner at the aquarium, but Amy suggests they can still go as friends. Despite initial awkwardness, Amy honestly answers Sheldon's questions about her dating life, and each wants the other to be happy, falling back into their old friendship. Later, Amy tells Sheldon she is ready to be his girlfriend again. Sheldon declines, since getting over her was too difficult, but wishes to remain friends. Amy hides her hurt feelings. Bernadette Rostenkowski (Melissa Rauch), Raj Koothrappali (Kunal Nayyar) and Emily Sweeney (Laura Spencer) drag Howard Wolowitz (Simon Helberg) to a soup kitchen to volunteer for the day, after Howard lies about going there to avoid Sheldon. At the soup kitchen, Howard hates washing dishes, but is delighted to meet Elon Musk, the founder of SpaceX. They bond over space travel. Meanwhile, Leonard Hofstadter (Johnny Galecki) and Penny (Kaley Cuoco) prepare Thanksgiving dinner at home for the gang. When he realizes she does not know his birthday, he proceeds to list personal things he knows about her, but accidentally reveals knowing she hates the orange lingerie he bought her, which she only disclosed in her journal. To apologize for reading it without permission, Leonard dances in the lingerie, asking Penny to post an image on her social media as punishment. Penny refuses, but Howard, Raj, Bernadette, and Emily barge into the scene in his apartment.

Production
The story was completed by Jim Reynolds, Jeremy Howe, and Tara Hernandez whilst the teleplay was written by Steve Holland, Maria Ferrari, and Adam Faberman. The episode was directed by Mark Cendrowski. It features a guest appearance of Wayne Wilderson as Travis, in addition to South-African American entrepreneur and business magnate, Elon Musk as himself.

It first aired in the US on CBS on November 19, 2015, and first aired in the UK on E4 on December 17, 2015.

Reception

Ratings
The episode was watched live by 15.19 million viewers, and had a ratings share of 3.8, during its original broadcast in the US. The 7 day data showed the episode received a total of 21.23 million viewers. Its UK premiere received 2.285 million viewers (7 day data), with the expanded 28 day data receiving 2.515 million viewers, making it the most watched programme on E4 for the week.

Critical response

"The Platonic Permutation" received mixed reviews from critics. Critics praised Sheldon and Amy's storyline but were critical of the other two subplots. IGN Jesse Schedeen said of Sheldon and Amy's storyline saved the episode from "total mediocrity". Caroline Preece of Den of Geek praised Sheldon and Amy's storyline as well, saying the other two subplots resolution's had "left something to be desired". Digital Spy Tom Eames said of "The Platonic Permutation": "Aside from a couple of sweet scenes with Sheldon and Amy, this was one of those episodes where you'd have a better time if you just looked at the photos and caught up on the synopsis on Wikipedia".

Schedeen opined that the soup kitchen storyline had potential but ultimately said it lacked humour. He and Eames criticized the lack of message for viewers about being thankfulness or generous and said that Howard's selfishness is instead rewarded by meeting Elon Musk. Preece was critical of the subplot saying Howard was "misused" by "providing lazy comedic relief to compensate for some of the more dramatic things" the show has done in "The Platonic Permutation" and the wider season.

Schedeen criticized Musk's appearance by saying he was not put to "very good use" and that his interactions with Howard were stiff and awkward. Eames concurred calling his appearance a "bit pointless and self-indulgent" and criticized his acting abilities.

Schedeen said the Leonard and Penny's subplot was mildly more entertaining that of the soup kitchen but said parts of it felt repetitive. Eames concurred calling the storyline "mildly funny".

Schedeen praised Sheldon and Amy's storyline it was a "welcome way of bringing Sheldon and Amy back together without needlessly pushing them back into each other's arms". Eames and Schedeen praised the rare downbeat ending for the series when Sheldon declined to be Amy's boyfriend. Eames opined that it was revitalizing to see "Sheldon act so mature by admitting that getting over Amy was the one thing he hasn't "excelled at", and deciding to stay just friends", calling it "one of the most realistic moments the show has ever had". Eames felt more focus should have been given to this storyline calling the other two "lazy and boring".

Awards
At the Art Directors Guild Awards 2015, John Shaffner (production designer), along with Francoise Cherry-Cohen (set designer), and Ann Shea (set decorator) won the  Excellence in Production Design Award - Multi-Camera Television Series award for The Big Bang Theory for their work on "The Platonic Permutation", "The Skywalker Incursion", and "The Mystery Date Observation".

References

External links
 

2015 American television episodes
The Big Bang Theory episodes
Cultural depictions of biologists
Cultural depictions of physicists
Cultural depictions of scientists
English-language television shows
Nerd culture
Elon Musk